Perempuan dalam Pasungan is a 1980 Indonesian drama film directed by Ismail Soebardjo. The film won four awards at the Indonesian Film Festival in 1981.

Accolades

References 

Citra Award winners
1980s Indonesian-language films
1980 films
1980 drama films
Indonesian drama films